Coleophora bagorella is a moth of the family Coleophoridae. It is found in Romania, Russia (Volga region), Turkey, Mongolia and China.

References

bagorella
Moths described in 1977
Moths of Europe
Moths of Asia